Rigoberto Chang Castillo (born 1 May 1950 in Tegucigalpa) is a Honduran lawyer and politician, currently serves as Secretary of the National Congress of Honduras after being elected representing the National Party of Honduras for Francisco Morazán.

References

1950 births
Living people
People from Tegucigalpa
20th-century Honduran lawyers
Deputies of the National Congress of Honduras
National Party of Honduras politicians